Malign may refer to

 Malign, a word meaning ‘hostile’, ‘evil’ or ‘ill-wishing’
 Malignant, a medical term describing a progressively worsening condition, such as cancer
 Malign (band), a Swedish black metal band